The Toronto St. Michael's Majors were a major junior ice hockey team in the Ontario Hockey League, based in Toronto, Ontario, Canada. The most recent franchise was revived on August 15, 1996. In 2007, the team relocated to Mississauga, Ontario and became the Mississauga St. Michael's Majors until 2012. The hockey program was founded and operated by St. Michael's College School in 1906, and adopted the name "Majors" in 1934, and was commonly referred to as St. Mike's Majors.

History
The St. Michael's College Hockey Team was established in 1906 when the team joined the junior division of the Ontario Hockey Association. The team was not known as the St. Michael's Majors until 1934, and also had the informal nickname of the "Irish". The school team played for 55 years until 1961 before suspending operations.

St. Michael's revived the Majors (Junior A Tier I) hockey team for the 1997–98 season in the Ontario Hockey League. In total, over one hundred St. Michael's Majors alumni have gone on to play in the National Hockey League, including 13 members of the Hockey Hall of Fame.

Early years, Allan Cup 1910

The hockey team was founded and operated by St. Michael's College School, a Catholic secondary school in uptown Toronto. The college's hockey team soon blossomed, as demand for a Catholic program was high. The school competed with their crosstown rivals, the Protestant organized Toronto Marlborough Athletic Club for Toronto's hockey supremacy. Players in the St. Michael's Majors program, were also enrolled in the school.

St. Michael's were successful in recruiting players and providing a complete education at the same time. The college built a strong reputation in moulding outstanding and well-rounded young citizens. Four years after the hockey program started, St. Michael's were Canadian Amateur Champions, winning the Allan Cup in 1910.

Birth of the Majors
In 1933, the Ontario Hockey Association's Junior division, split into 'A' and 'B' levels. St. Michael's also divided its hockey program into two teams accordingly. The Junior 'A' team became the Majors, the Junior 'B' team was known as St. Michael's Buzzers.

Memorial Cup 1934
The Majors dominated the Junior A hockey scene during the 1933–34 season. The team was undefeated in the regular season, and kept rolling through the playoffs, the Ontario Championship, Eastern Canadian Championship and the Memorial Cup. Also of note, in 1933-34 the Buzzers won the Sutherland Cup as Ontario Junior 'B' champions.

St. Michael's featured the likes of Bobby Bauer, Reg Hamilton, Art Jackson, Regis (Pep) Kelly, Nick Metz, Don Wilson, Mickey Drouillard, goaltenders Harvey Teno and Jack Hamilton. The Toronto team was coached by Dr. W. J. (Jerry) Laflamme, a dentist who had quite a hockey history. He refereed in the NHL in the 1920s. That was after he had played defence on the Allan Cup winners from St. Michael's in 1909-1910 and captained the Allan Cup-winning Dentals of Toronto in 1916–17.

In the 1934 playoffs St. Michael's skated to 8–2, and 9-3 victories versus the Ottawa Shamrocks to win the two-game series for the Ontario title. In the following series, Toronto faced the Charlottetown Abegweits in the eastern final, played in Toronto. The Majors prevailed again in two games, by scores of 12-2 and 7–2.
The Memorial Cup final was played at Shea's Amphitheatre in Winnipeg, where St. Michael's faced the Edmonton Athletic Club in a best-of-three series for the title. The Majors picked up Turk Broda from the Winnipeg Monarchs to back up if goaltender Harvey Teno was injured. St. Mike's opened with a 5–0 victory over the Athletics on April 3. More than 4,500 fans showed up for game 2 on April 5. St. Michael's won its first Memorial Cup championship, with a 6–4 victory in overtime.

1937 OHA Champions
St. Michael's made their second trip to the OHA finals in 1937, and again faced the same opponent from in 1934, the Stratford Midgets. Toronto prevailed winning 3 games to 2. In the Ontario Championship, St. Michael's faced a familiar foe in the Copper Cliff Redmen. The Redmen previously played in Newmarket in the same league as Toronto, but switched to NOHA. Toronto lost to the northern Ontario champions, in 2 straight games.

Memorial Cup 1945
Joe Primeau returned to coach the 1945 Memorial Cup St. Michael's team, after being runners-up in the OHA finals in 1944. In 1945, Toronto won the J. Ross Robertson Cup, defeating the Galt Black Hawks in four games straight. The Majors advanced further by eliminating the Montreal Royals in six games in the eastern final. They won the sixth game 7-4 behind Joe Sadler's three goals in front of 10,548 fans at Maple Leaf Gardens on April 11.

The Memorial Cup final was played in its entirety at Maple Leaf Gardens. The Majors' opponents were the Moose Jaw Canucks coached by Roy Bentley. Toronto won game one 8–5 on April 14, then Moose Jaw turned the tables on April 16 with a 5–3 victory to even the series. The Majors won each of the next three games by scores of 6–3, 4-3 and 7–2 in the deciding game. Trail, B.C. native Frank Turik scored three hat tricks in the five games to become the tournament's leading goal scorer.

Paid attendance for the five games was 65,437, which exceeded the Maple Leaf Gardens junior record for five games (59,301) that had been set in 1943 when the Winnipeg Rangers tangled with the Oshawa Generals. That 1943 series still held the six-game record of 73,867.

Memorial Cup 1946
St. Michael's returned to the Memorial Cup for a second consecutive year in 1946. The Majors defeated the Oshawa Generals in a six-game, coming back from two games behind for the OHA championship. St. Michael's then swept the Montreal Junior Canadiens in three games straight in the eastern finals.

The Majors met up with the Winnipeg Monarchs at Maple Leaf Gardens on April 13 to start the best-of-seven series for the national championship. Winnipeg won the first game 3 to 2, then Toronto rallied to win the next two games 5 to 3, and 7 to 3, before the Monarchs even the series in game four, winning 4 to 3. Toronto scored a 7 to 4 victory in game five, needing only one more win to be the second team to repeat as Memorial Cup champions. Winnipeg spoiled the plans, winning consecutive 4 to 2 victories to take the cup back west in 1946.

Memorial Cup 1947

The 1947 cup would be a rematch of the 1945 Memorial Cup final versus the Moose Jaw Canucks. This series however, was not played at Maple Leaf Gardens, but rather played in Winnipeg, Moose Jaw and Regina. On the road to their third consecutive Memorial Cup appearance, St. Michael's repeated their sweep of the Galt Black Hawks in the OHA finals from two 1945, and the previous year's sweep on the Montreal Jr. Canadiens in the eastern finals.

The Memorial Cup's best-of-seven final opened in Winnipeg on April 15 with Toronto hammering Moose Jaw 12 to 3. The teams then headed for Moose Jaw, where game two was to be played on April 17, at the newly constructed arena. Toronto St. Michael's won that game 6 to 1. Game three was played in Regina, which Toronto kept up its momentum, winning 8 to 1. Game three ended with seven minutes to play in the third period, when the ice was littered for a second time with broken bottles thrown from the stands. Three nights later in Regina, St. Michael's finished the series with a 3 to 2 victory, for their third Memorial Cup title.

Memorial Cup 1961
The Basilian fathers lobbied for a shortened schedule for the Majors in the OHA's top tier of junior hockey after the 1958–59 season, since they believed it was too long and detrimental to academic studies for their students. Bob Goldham resigned as head coach of the Majors in 1960, and Father David Bauer took over as head coach for the 1960–61 OHA season in addition to his role as general manager. He stressed fundamentals of defensive play without the puck and taught players how to absorb contact without getting hurt. He occasionally had his players switch positions with one another to learn an appreciation of their teammate's contributions. The Majors finished in second place during the season, then defeated the Guelph Royals in the playoffs for the OHA championship. The Majors won the Eastern Canada final defeating the Moncton Beavers then travelled to Edmonton to play in the 1961 Memorial Cup. The Majors defeated the Edmonton Oil Kings in six games and won the school's fourth Memorial Cup.

Majors cease operations

The Basilian fathers again discussed the length of the season and the amount of travel having an effect on academics. They were also concerned with increasing physical play and growing similarities with professional leagues. The Majors had played 98 games including the regular season and playoffs for the Memorial Cup. St. Michael's could no longer justify participation in the top tier of the OHA and chose to withdraw from the Ontario Hockey Association Junior A series. Bauer stated in a 1987 interview that, "We regretted very much leaving because we knew that this [school] is a major recreational institution in this country".

After the official announcement on June 6, 1961, Bauer placed his protégé Jim Gregory in charge of the team. The Majors operated for one more season and played a shortened 33-game schedule in the Metro Junior A League for the 1961–62 OHA season. The team was transferred to Neil McNeil High School and became known as the Toronto Neil McNeil Maroons in 1962.

Conn Smythe and the Toronto Maple Leafs wanted to keep the St. Michael's team in operation as a source of players, and then created the Metro Junior A League to help alleviate the college's concerns.

The St. Michael's team finished in first place in the Metro Junior A league, and competed for the J. Ross Robertson Cup again in 1962. Coached by Ted Flanagan, the team lost in the Cup finals to the Hamilton Red Wings.

Despite being the league champions in the 1961–62 season, St. Michael's discontinued its program altogether, and the team was relocated to Neil McNeil Catholic Secondary School in Scarborough, Ontario, becoming the Toronto Neil McNeil Maroons. Father Bauer chose to pursue building a university-educated Canadian National team instead.

Modern era
The modern era of the St. Michael's Majors began on August 15, 1996, when the college was admitted to the OHL as an expansion team. Players were required to attend St. Michael's College School in Toronto but this changed during the second season following player trade demands and refusals to attend. The team would take part each year in the "Priority Selection" drafting new players.

Founded by St. Michael's College School, the team was now owned by Eugene Melnyk, who was the owner of the Ottawa Senators and was CEO of Biovail Corporation. Melnyk pursued several deals to get a new arena for his team, but none came to fruition. One of Melnyk's foiled plans included purchasing Maple Leaf Gardens. The revived Majors struggled on the ice, and missed the playoffs in each of their first three seasons. During their second season, the Majors started strong, but traded four of their best players (Sheldon Keefe, Mike Jefferson, Ryan Barnes and Shawn Cation) to the Barrie Colts midway through the season, as a result of controversy surrounding David Frost.

The Majors made breakthroughs in their fourth season. Toronto reached the conference finals four consecutive years from 2001 to 2004. Their closest point to reaching the league finals was in 2003, leading 3 games to 2 versus the Ottawa 67's and losing game six on home ice in overtime.

The Majors played on the smallest ice surface in the OHL, which tended to have a higher average of shots on goal per game than other arenas. Fittingly, the Majors produced several noted goaltenders in their recent history, including Peter Budaj, Andy Chiodo and Justin Peters.

The Majors had strong rivalries with the Mississauga IceDogs and Brampton Battalion, both of which are local Greater Toronto Area teams who came into the OHL within a year of the Majors.

On July 12, 2006, Eugene Melnyk bought the Mississauga IceDogs. After the 2006–07 season, Melnyk sold the IceDogs, and moved the Majors to the Hershey Centre in Mississauga. The IceDogs, in turn, moved to Jack Gatecliff Arena in St. Catharines, Ontario.

Memorial Cup 2011

The Majors won the right to host the 2011 Memorial Cup over the Barrie Colts, Kingston Frontenacs and Windsor Spitfires. The Ontario Hockey League (OHL) announced on May 10, 2010 that the Mississauga St. Michael's Majors were chosen to host the 93rd annual Memorial Cup at the Hershey Centre from May 20–29, 2011. The Saint John Sea Dogs defeated the Majors 3–1 in the final.

Championships

Memorial Cup
1934 Champions vs. Edmonton Athletic Club
1945 Champions vs. Moose Jaw Canucks
1946 Finalists vs. Winnipeg Monarchs
1947 Champions vs. Moose Jaw Canucks
1961 Champions vs. Edmonton Oil Kings
2011 Finalists vs. Saint John Sea Dogs

George Richardson Memorial Trophy
1934 Champions vs. Charlottetown Abegweits
1945 Champions vs. Montreal Royals
1946 Champions vs. Montreal Junior Canadiens
1947 Champions vs. Montreal Junior Canadiens
1961 Champions vs. Moncton Beavers

Division titles
1961-62 Metro Junior A League
2001-02 Emms Trophy – Central Division
2003-04 Emms Trophy – Central Division
2010-11 Emms Trophy – Central Division

J. Ross Robertson Cup
1934 Champions vs. Stratford Midgets
1937 Champions vs. Stratford Midgets
1944 Finalists vs. Oshawa Generals
1945 Champions vs. Galt Red Wings
1946 Champions vs. Oshawa Generals
1947 Champions vs. Galt Red Wings
1953 Finalists vs. Barrie Flyers
1959 Finalists vs. Peterborough Petes
1960 Finalists vs. St. Catharines Teepees
1961 Champions vs. Guelph Royals
1962 Finalists vs. Hamilton Red Wings
2011 Finalists vs. Owen Sound Attack

Uniforms and logos

The primary logo for the Majors displays "St. Michael's" written in script, with a Majors underscore written in light blue. The Toronto St. Michael's Majors colours are light blue, navy blue & white. The Majors hockey uniforms feature a different logo, a large letter "M" on the front, with the school crest (inset right) on the upper left chest, and the St. Michael's cloverleaf patch on the shoulders.

Home uniforms have a white background, navy blue shoulders and arms, with light blue trim. Road uniforms have a light blue background, with navy blue shoulders, and white trim. The Majors have also used a third jersey with a stylized "M" on the front, and without the navy blue shoulders.

To celebrate the Majors 10th season back in the league, the team launched a new 3rd jersey with the shoulder cloverleaf logo on the front. The jersey is also baby blue in colour. After the move, the Majors' logo was changed slightly to a more modernized look, and new jerseys were unveiled.

Arenas

The St. Michael's Majors play at the school-owned St. Michael's College School Arena. The arena is located in uptown Toronto near the intersection of Bathurst Street and St. Clair Avenue behind St. Michael's College School. The college arena is by far the smallest in the Ontario Hockey League in terms of both ice size and seating. The arena is also home to the St. Michael's Buzzers of the Ontario Provincial Junior A Hockey League.

The St. Michael's Majors played at Maple Leaf Gardens for their first three seasons from 1997 to 2000. The original Majors had played at Maple Leaf Gardens from its construction in 1931 to their folding in the early 1960s. When the Gardens was scheduled to close a year after the last Toronto Maple Leafs game, Maple Leaf Sports and Entertainment evicted the Majors, who moved to the arena on the college campus. The major junior team had only played there rarely before.

The Majors also played selected home games during the 1999–00 season at the Air Canada Centre vs the Mississauga IceDogs and Brampton Battalion, and also an inter-league game versus the Montreal Rocket.

In 2003-04 and 2006–07 seasons, the Majors played two home games vs the Ottawa 67's at Scotiabank Place in Kanata, Ontario.  This arose from the common ownership between the St. Michael's Majors and the Ottawa Senators by Eugene Melnyk.

The Mississauga St. Michael's Majors played home games at the Hershey Centre in northeast Mississauga, near the junction of Highway 401 & Highway 403. The Hershey Centre hosted the OHL All-Star Game in 2000. The arena also hosted the 2011 Memorial Cup from May 19–29.

Coaches
List of modern era coaches with multiple seasons in parentheses.

Players

Award winners
1944-45 - Leo Gravelle Eddie Powers Memorial Trophy Scoring Champion
1945-46 - Tod Sloan Red Tilson Trophy Most Outstanding Player, Eddie Powers Memorial Trophy Scoring Champion
1946-47 - Ed Sandford Red Tilson Trophy Most Outstanding Player
1946-47 - Fleming Mackell Eddie Powers Memorial Trophy Scoring Champion
1956-57 - Frank Mahovlich Red Tilson Trophy Most Outstanding Player
1959-60 - Gerry Cheevers Dave Pinkney Trophy Lowest Team GAA
1960-61 - Brucer Draper William Hanley Trophy Most Sportsmanlike Player
1997 - Charlie Stephens Jack Ferguson Award First Overall Draft Pick
1997-98 - Bujar Amidovski Leo Lalonde Memorial Trophy Overage Player of the Year & OHL Goaltender of the Year
2000-01 - Andy Chiodo F.W. "Dinty" Moore Trophy Best Rookie GAA
2002-03 - Andy Chiodo OHL Goaltender of the Year
2003-04 - Scott Lehman Bobby Smith Trophy Scholastic Player of the Year

Honoured players
The St. Michael's Majors have retired four jersey numbers:
3 - Red Kelly
5 - Ted Lindsay
9 - Dave Keon
12 - Dick Duff

The St. Michael's Majors have honoured the following people with banners in the rafters.

NHL alumni
Hockey Hall of Fame inductees listed in bold type.

Original era Majors (1906 to 1962)

Modern era Majors (1997 to 2012)

Season-by-season results

Regular season

Original

Revived

Playoffs
 1997–98 Out of playoffs.
 1998–99 Out of playoffs.
 1999–00 Out of playoffs.
 2000–01 Defeated Peterborough Petes 4 games to 3 in conference quarter-finals. Defeated Sudbury Wolves 4 games to 3 in conference semi-finals. Lost to Ottawa 67's 4 games to 0 in conference finals.
 2001–02 Defeated North Bay Centennials 4 games to 0 in conference quarter-finals. Defeated Ottawa 67's 4 games to 3 in conference semi-finals. Lost to Barrie Colts 4 games to 0 in conference finals.
 2002–03 Defeated Belleville Bulls 4 games to 3 in conference quarter-finals. Defeated Brampton Battalion 4 games to 1 in conference semi-finals. Lost to Ottawa 67's 4 games to 3 in conference finals.
 2003–04 Defeated Sudbury Wolves 4 games to 3 in conference quarter-finals. Defeated Brampton Battalion 4 games to 1 in conference semi-finals. Lost to Mississauga IceDogs 4 games to 2 in conference finals.
 2004–05 Defeated Mississauga IceDogs 4 games to 1 in conference quarter-finals. Lost to Peterborough Petes 4 games to 1 in conference semi-finals.
 2005–06 Lost to Barrie Colts 4 games to 0 in conference quarter-finals.
 2006–07 Out of playoffs.
Team relocated to Mississauga
 2007–08 – Lost to Niagara IceDogs 4 games to 0 in conference quarter-finals.
 2008–09 – Defeated Barrie Colts 4 games to 1 in conference quarter-finals. Lost to Brampton Battalion 4 games to 2 in conference semi-finals.
 2009-10 - Defeated Peterborough Petes 4 games to 0 in conference quarter-finals.Defeated Ottawa 67's 4 games to 3 in conference semi-finals.Lost to Barrie Colts 4 games to 1 in conference finals.
 2010-11 - Defeated Belleville Bulls 4 games to 0 in conference quarter-finals.Defeated Sudbury Wolves 4 games to 0 in conference semi-finals.Defeated Niagara IceDogs 4 games to 1 in conference finals.Lost to Owen Sound Attack 4 games to 3 in OHL finals.Finished Memorial Cup round-robin in second place. Defeated Kootenay Ice 3–1 in semi-final game.  Lost to Saint John Sea Dogs 3–1 in final game.
 2011–12 – Lost to Barrie Colts 4 games to 2 in conference quarter-finals.

Bibliography

References

Ice hockey clubs established in 1996
Ice hockey teams in Toronto
Ice hockey teams in Ontario
Defunct Ontario Hockey League teams
Ontario Hockey League teams
Sport in Mississauga
1996 establishments in Ontario
Ice hockey clubs disestablished in 2012
2012 disestablishments in Ontario